Minimalism in structured writing, topic-based authoring, and technical writing in general is based on the ideas of John Millar Carroll and others. Minimalism strives to reduce interference of information delivery with the user's sense-making process. It does not try to eliminate any chance of the user making a mistake, but regards an error as a teachable moment that content can exploit.

Like Robert E. Horn's work on information mapping, John Carroll's principles of Minimalism were based in part on cognitive studies and learning research at Harvard and Columbia University, by Jerome Bruner, Jerome Kagan, B.F. Skinner, George A. Miller, and others. Carroll argues that training materials should present short task-oriented chunks, not lengthy, monolithic documentation that tries to explain everything in a long narrative.

A historian of technical communication, R. John Brockmann, points out that Fred Bethke and others at IBM enunciated task orientation as a principle a decade earlier in a report on IBM Publishing Guidelines.

Carroll observes that modern users are often already familiar with much of what a typical long manual describes. What they need is information to solve a task at hand. He feels that documentation should encourage them to do this with a minimum of systematic instruction.

Darwin Information Typing Architecture (DITA) is built on Carroll's theories of Minimalism and Horn's theories of Information Mapping.

Minimalism is a large part of JoAnn Hackos' recent workshops and books on information development using structured writing and the DITA XML standard.

Good writing means that the message is directly clear to the projected audience. Adopting a minimalist method may appear, in the short-term, to cost more, as writers must cut up and rephrase content into single free-standing chunks. However, the longer-term brings cost-saving benefits, particularly in translation and localization, where often sum is on a ‘per word’ basis. But the greatest advantage for companies is user fulfillment. The less time a customer spends working out how to do something, the more likely they are to purchase again.

References
 IBM Publishing Guidelines (1981)
 
 
 
 
 
 

Technical communication